Group dances are danced by groups of people simultaneously, as opposed to individuals dancing alone or individually, and as opposed to couples dancing together but independently of others dancing at the same time, if any.  

The dances are generally, but not always, coordinated or standardized in such a way that all the individuals in the group are dancing the same steps at the same time.  Alternatively, various groups within the larger group may be dancing different, but complementary, parts of the larger dance.  An exception to this generalization must be pointed out where groups of individuals are dancing independently of each other, but with the purpose of creating a "group" feeling or experience, such as might accompany various forms of ritual dancing.

Group dances include the following dance forms or styles:

 Folk dance
 Circle dance
 Contra dance
 English Country Dance
 Maypole dance
 Square dance
 Traditional square dance
 Modern western square dance
 Triangle Dance
 Line dance
 Novelty and fad dances
 Bunny Hop
 Chicken Dance
 Para Para
 Polonaise
 Round dance
 Rueda de Casino
 Universal Peace Dance

See also 
 List of basic dance topics
 List of dances